In accounting, a current asset is any asset which can reasonably be expected to be sold, consumed, or exhausted through the normal operations of a business within the current fiscal year or operating cycle or financial year (whichever period is longer). Typical current assets include cash, cash equivalents, short-term investments which in the ordinary activity are mainly related to non-strategic companies in the process of being sold (usually as a result of private negotiations), accounts receivable, stock inventory, supplies, and the portion of prepaid liabilities (sometimes referred to as prepaid expenses) which will be paid within a year. In simple words, assets which are held for a short period are known as current assets. Such assets are expected to be realised in cash or consumed during the normal operating cycle of the business.
On a balance sheet, assets will typically be classified into current assets and long-term assets. 

The current ratio is calculated by dividing total current assets by total current liabilities. It is frequently used as an indicator of a company's liquidity, which is its ability to meet short-term obligations. The difference between current assets and current liability is referred to as trade working capital.

The quick ratio, or acid-test, measures the ability of a company to use its near cash or quick assets to extinguish or retire its current liabilities immediately. Quick assets are those that can be quickly turned into cash if necessary. It would not be used for substantial period of time such as, normally, twelve months.

References

Asset